The Warren Township District No. 4 School, also known as the Bunert School, is a one-room schoolhouse building located at 27900 Bunert Road in Warren, Michigan. It was listed on the National Register of Historic Places in 2012 and designated a Michigan State Historic Site in 1989. It is the last one-room schoolhouse remaining in Warren.

History
In January 1875, August and Mine Bunert sold a plot of land at the northeast corner of the intersection of Bunert and Martin Roads to the Warren School District for the purpose of constructing a school.  The district constructed this one-room schoolhouse on the site later in the year, formally known as the Warren Township District No. 4 School, but commonly called the Bunert School after the original landowners.  The building was used for K-8 students until 1928, when a second building was constructed nearby for older students.  The original Bunert School was then used for K-4 until 1944, when the nearby Charwood School was built.  That span makes the school the longest-used one-room schoolhouse in Warren.

After 1944, the district used the structure as a meeting hall; it was later sold to John O'Connor (along with the 1928 structure), and converted into a six-room residence.  The Santa Maria Lodge purchased both buildings in 1970.  In 1987, the Lodge offered the 1875 building to the Warren Historical Society, who raised $22,000 to restore it.  The structure was moved to its present location in 1988, and is used as an educational museum.  The 1927 school is still in its original location.

Description
The Warren Township District No. 4 School is a single-story wood frame structure with a gable roof sitting on a concrete foundation. The exterior is covered with board and batten siding, and the interior has wooden floors, tin ceiling, and wooden wainscoting.

References

External links
Bunert School Museum history (with pictures)
Saving Bunert School
Warren Historical Society's page on the Bunert School
Warren Township District 4 School from the City of Warren

National Register of Historic Places in Macomb County, Michigan
School buildings completed in 1875
Michigan State Historic Sites
Museums in Macomb County, Michigan
Education museums in the United States
Warren, Michigan
1875 establishments in Michigan